William Arthur Knibbs (born January 24, 1942 – September 16, 2006) was a Canadian professional ice hockey player who played 53 games in the National Hockey League with the Boston Bruins during the 1964–65 season. The rest of his career, which lasted from 1962 to 1975, was mainly spent in the American Hockey League.

Knibbs scored seven goal for Boston in his lone NHL season.  His first goal occurred on December 16, 1964 in the Bruins' 7-5 loss to the Chicago Blackhawks at Chicago Stadium.

Career statistics

Regular season and playoffs

External links

1942 births
2006 deaths
Baltimore Clippers players
Barrie Flyers players
Boston Bruins players
Buffalo Bisons (AHL) players
Canadian ice hockey centres
Niagara Falls Flyers (1960–1972) players
Omaha Knights (CHL) players
Providence Reds players
Rochester Americans players
Seattle Totems (WHL) players
Ice hockey people from Toronto